Kassel can refer to:

Places
 Kassel, a town in Hesse, Germany
 Landgraviate of Hesse-Kassel
 Electorate of Hesse
 Kassel (region) an administrative region in Germany
 Kassel (district) a district in Germany
 Komarivka, Velyka Mykhailivka Raion, a town in Ukraine formerly known as Kassel
 Cassel, Nord a town in France, known in Dutch as Kassel
 Province of Kurhessen
 KSV Hessen Kassel

Surnames
Chuck Kassel (born 1903), a former professional American football player
Josh Kassel (born 1985), an American college ice hockey goaltender
Karl Kassel (born 1952), a Democrat running for the Alaska House of Representatives from district 7 (Fairbanks)
Matt Kassel (born 1989), a midfielder for the University of Maryland soccer team
Nabil Kassel (born 1984), an Algerian boxer best known to win the middleweight gold at the 2007 All-Africa Games
Philip Kassel (born 1876), an American gymnast and track and field athlete who competed in the 1904 Summer Olympics
Rudolf Kassel (1926–2020), a German classical philologist
Tichi Wilkerson Kassel (1926–2004), an American film personality and the publisher of The Hollywood Reporter

Other uses
Battle of Kassel (1945), a four-day struggle between the U.S. Army and the German Army in April 1945 for Kassel
Kassel 12, a German glider used for training, developed in the 1920s
Kassel conversations, the conventional name of an early medieval text preserved in a manuscript from c.810
Kassel kerb, a concave-section made for buses kerb stone
Kassel Literary Prize, an annual prize awarded in recognition of "grotesque and comic work" at a high artistic level
Kassel Nabil (born 1984), a boxer from Algeria